Giovanni Cosimo Villifranchi (or Villafranchi, 1646–1699) was, according to Robert Lamar Weaver, "the most productive and creative Italian comic librettist in the second half of the 17th century."  He wrote the majority of comic works performed at the Villa Pratolino during the last quarter of the seventeenth century.  Villifranchi advocated simplicity in comic language, in opposition to the complex linguistic formality of the commedia erudita practiced by such earlier Florentine authors as Giambattista Ricciardi.

References

Further reading

 Gianturco, Carolyn. "Il Trespolo tutore di Stradella e di Pasquini," Venezia e il melodramma nel settecento: Venice 1973–5, i, 185–98. 
 Weaver, Robert Lamar and Norma. A Chronology of Music in the Florentine Theater, i: 1590–1750 (Detroit, 1978); ii: 1751–1800 (Warren, MI, 1993)
 Leve, James Samuel . "Humor and intrigue: A comparative study of comic opera in Florence and Rome during the late seventeenth century." Ph.D. diss., Yale University, 1998.

1646 births
1699 deaths
Italian opera librettists
Italian dramatists and playwrights
Italian male dramatists and playwrights